Trebisht is a former municipality in the Dibër County, eastern Albania. At the 2015 local government reform it became a subdivision of the municipality Bulqizë. The population at the 2011 census was 993.

Geography
The village is situated in the geographical area of Gollobordë.

Within the municipality, the village of Trebisht consists of the three neighborhoods of Trebisht-Muçinë, Trebisht-Balaj, and Trebisht-Çelebi. (in the local Macedonian dialect - Dunomala, Gurnomala and Unomala). These neighborhoods are  divided into smaller ones.

Demographic history 
A demographic study published in 1878, reflecting statistics of the male population from 1873, stated that the population of Trébichta consisted of 150 households with 144 Bulgarian Christians and 265 Pomaks.

In the early 20th century, Trebisht was a village with a mixed population of Bulgarian Muslims and Bulgarian Christians, according to Bulgarian geographer Vasil Kanchov's statistics. The Muslim population was prevalent, with 2500 Bulgarian Muslims reported and 70 Bulgarian Christians—97.3% Muslim and 2.7% Christian. The neighboring villages of Gjinovec (210 Christian Slavs), Vërnicë (300 Christian Slavs) and Klenjë (240 Christian Slavs, 230 Muslim Slavs) together with Trebisht produce a total of 820 Christians and 2830 Muslims, meaning the total municipality at that time 23.1% Christian and 76.9% Muslim.

Villages located in the Trebisht administrative unit contain the following populations: Gjinovec and Klenjë are inhabited solely by a Slavic speaking population which contain Macedonian Muslim (Torbeš) or Muslim Bulgarians. Vërnicë is inhabited by an Albanian population that dominates demographically in the village that also contains a significant population of Slavic Speakers (Muslim and Orthodox Macedonians or Bulgarians). The Muslim Macedonian and Orthodox Macedonian population of the area are speakers of a south Slavic language (Macedonian or Bulgarian).

The inhabitants of Trebisht are speakers of a south Slavic dialect and the village has traditionally consisted of a mixed Slavic Orthodox Christian (Macedonian or Bulgarian) and (Macedonian Muslim Torbeš or Bulgarian Muslim) population. Within Macedonian academia, the language spoken has been regarded as Macedonian, while within Bulgarian academia, the dialect of Trebisht is considered as part of the Bulgarian language. The local population of the village lack official recognition as a Macedonian minority from the Albanian government. In 2020, an ethnic Macedonian was elected as an administrator of Trebisht.

Education
On April 14, 1914, in Peshkopi was established, the first Albanian school and then, in the village of Trebisht.  After nine years, was opened dormitory in Dibra for the children in remote areas, who followed the Albanian lessons.  In 2009, a Macedonian language school opened in Trebisht, however these courses were met with fierce opposition from local authorities who called for the school to be shut down. Intervention from the Albanian Ministry of Education and from the Albanian Prime minister, Sali Berisha, ensured that the Macedonian language courses were able to continue education over 200 young Macedonians in their native Macedonian language.

References

Former municipalities in Dibër County
Albania–North Macedonia border crossings
Administrative units of Bulqizë
Macedonian Muslim villages